In the Romanian Naval Forces, Aspirant is the lowest commissioned rank, equivalent to the rank of Ensign.

Aspirant (Romania)
Aspirant (Romania)